Greenberger is a surname. Notable people with the surname include:

Daniel Greenberger (born 1932), American physicist
David Greenberger (born 1954), American artist, writer and radio commentator
Marcia Greenberger, American lawyer
Robert Greenberger (born 1958), American writer

See also
Francis J. Greenburger (born 1949), American real estate developer